Shripad Narayan Pendse (5 January 1913 – 23 March 2007) was a writer of several Marathi novels.

Biography
Shripad Narayan Pendse hailed from Maharashtra, India. He was born to a village Murdi, from Taluka Dapoli in Ratnagiri District. 

His novel, Rathachakra (The Chariot-Wheel), received a Sahitya Akademi Award in 1963.

His novel, Garambicha Bapu, was translated in 1969 into English, titled –Wild Bapu of Garambi', as a part of the UNESCO Collection of Representative Works, which had been organized with Sahitya Akademi collaboration.Haddapar (The Outcast) and Tumbadche Khot'' (The Khots of Tumbad) are Pendse's other two popular novels.

He was offered a Rockfeller Foundation Scholarship, under which he travelled Europe and United States in order to study and exchange his views with other novelists and learned people. He travelled for more than one year with his wife with the help of this scholarship. In his tour to England, France and the US, he met many well known writers, including E. M. Forster. EM Forster's letter to SN Pendse is reproduced in the autobiography of SN Pendse on page 243,244,245 SN Pendse "Lekhak Ani Manus" Ek Mitra published by Mouj publishers publication 228, in November 1974..

WorksNovelsElgar in 1949
Haddapar in 1950
Garambicha Bapu in 1952
Hatya in 1954
Yashoda (small novel) in 1957
Kalandar in 1959
Rathachakra in 1962
Lavhali in 1966 
Octopus in 1972. 
Akant in 1978
Tumbadache Khot Part 1 and Part 2 in 1987
Garambichi Radha in 1993
Ek Hoti Aji in 1995
Kameru in 1997
Ghagar Rikami Re Rangamali in 2002
Haak Abhalachi in 2007Dramas 
Mahapur −1961
Rajemastar −1964
Yashoda-drama −1965 
Garambicha Bapu −1965
Sambhusanchya Chalit −1967
Asa zala aani ujadala −1969
Chakravyuha −1970
Rathachakra −1975
Pandit ! Ata Tari Shahane Vha ! -1978
Dr. Huddar −1990Short storiesJumman −1956OtherPrayaschitta -translation of The Scarlet Letter in 1969
Best upakramachi katha −1972 (he was Deputy Public Relations Officer in BEST undertaking and retired in 1972)ArticlesEk Muktasanvad- Udyachya Kadambarikarashi in 1995
Adhyatacha Shodh in 1996
Ek Durlabh Sneh in 1996CharacterisationKhadakavaril Hiraval in 1941AutobiographyShri Na Pendse-Manus Ani Lekhak in 1974Translation into other languages'''
Garambicha Bapu- In Hindi (1959) and English (1969)
Kalandar- In Gujarati (1970)
Rathachakra- In Gujarati (1971)
Octopus- In Hindi (1976)
Hatya- In Hindi (1976)

Footnotes 

This article is based on his autobiography, written in 1974, and published by Mauj Prakashan.

1913 births
2007 deaths
Marathi-language writers
Recipients of the Sahitya Akademi Award in Marathi
20th-century Indian poets
Indian male poets
Poets from Maharashtra
20th-century Indian male writers